Henry Endicott Stebbins (1905 in Milton, Massachusetts – 1973) was a career Foreign Service Officer who was the first US Ambassador to Nepal.  He also served as Ambassador to Uganda.

Early life

Stebbins’ parents were Rev. Roderick Stebbins and Edith Endicott (Marean) Stebbins.  He graduated from Milton Academy and then Harvard in 1927.

Career
On July 1, 1939, Stebbins entered the State Department as foreign service officer of Class 8. He had various posts throughout Europe and Turkey before being named vice consul in London under Joseph P. Kennedy in 1939. When he was first secretary of the London Embassy in 1945, he met his future wife, Barbara Jennifer Worthington, a native of Dorset, England. In 1951 he went to Melbourne, Australia as Consul.  President Dwight D. Eisenhower promoted him to foreign service inspector in 1955, naming him senior inspector a year later. In 1959 Eisenhower named Stebbins the first Ambassador to Nepal where he served until 1966.

When his 89 year old mother found out President Lyndon B. Johnson appointed him Ambassador to Uganda in 1966, she said she was thrilled to hear of his appointment but wished he was a street sweeper in Milton because “at least he’d be home.”  He retired from the Service three years later, returning to Milton.

Death
On March 28, 1973, Stebbins apparently fell from the deck of the S.S. Leonardo da Vinci and was considered lost at sea.

See also
List of people who disappeared mysteriously at sea

References

External links
JFK Library archives which includes biographical information on Stebbins

1905 births
1970s missing person cases
1973 deaths
20th-century American diplomats
Ambassadors of the United States to Nepal
Ambassadors of the United States to Uganda
Harvard University alumni
Milton Academy alumni
Missing people
People from Milton, Massachusetts
People lost at sea